Brigadier General (retired) Ahmed Abdullahi was Military Administrator of Kwara State, Nigeria between December 1987 and July 1988 during the military regime under General Ibrahim Babangida.

Birth and education

Abdullahi was born in Freetown, Sierra Leone, on 22 August 1945. He attended primary schools in Zaria and Keffi and secondary schools in Freetown and Abuja. 
He was admitted to the Nigerian Defence Academy, Kaduna, graduating in 1968. Later he studied at the British Army Royal School of Signals for Basic Communications (1970–1971), US Army School of Artillery, Oklahoma, United States (1975), Command and Staff College, Jaji (1978), US Marines Staff College, Onautico, USA (1980–1981) and the Imperial Defence College, London (1991–1992).

Military career

Abdullahi was commissioned as lieutenant in July 1968. He was appointed second in command and then commander of 2 Division Signal Regiment, Benin City. In 1973 he became Commander, 4th division Signal Regiment. He was a lecturer at the Command and Staff College,  Jaji (1982–1984).

Lt. Colonel Abdullahi was appointed Minister of Communications (1984–1985).
In this role, he assisted in the coup of August 1985 in which General Ibrahim Babangida took power.
On 12 September 1985 he was appointed Minister of Social Development, Youth and Sport, and was a member of the Federal Executive Council.
He was appointed military governor of Kwara State from December 1987 until July 1988.
General Abdullahi was Director of Military Intelligence (DMI) and a supporter of General Sani Abacha at the time of the annulment of the Presidential election of M.K.O. Abiola in 1993, which led to Sani Abacha taking power as head of state.

References

Nigerian generals
Living people
1945 births
Governors of Kwara State
People from Freetown
Nigerian Defence Academy alumni
Sierra Leonean emigrants to Nigeria